Here for It is the first extended play (EP) from American recording R&B girl group Xscape. The EP was released on March 2, 2018, through RedZone Entertainment.  This is Xscape's first release in twenty years and as a trio.

Background and release
On February 28, 2017, Kandi Burruss, LaTocha Scott, Tameka "Tiny" Cottle and Tamika Scott gave their first interview in over twenty years on V-103 Atlanta. The group announced their reunion stating they had offers on the table but nothing was set in stone at the time. A few months later the group were announced to perform at the Essence Festival 2017. On December 27, 2017, it was announced Xscape would be releasing an EP in Spring 2018 as a trio titled "Here for It" and would feature six brand new songs including their two most recent singles "Dream Killa" and "Wifed Up". Burruss stated she would not be joining the group in new music as she had other projects going on and she would be playing Roxie Hart on Broadway's Musical Chicago. "Here for It" was given several release dates, January 12, 2018, February 14, 2018 and the most recent release date March 2, 2018.

Singles
"Dream Killa" and "Wifed Up" were both released as singles on December 1, 2017.

Other singles
"Here for It" was released as the first promotional single on 1 January 2018.

Track listing 
Credits taken from TIDAL.

Release history

References

2018 EPs
Xscape (group) albums